Tatrasuchus is an extinct genus of temnospondyl amphibian from the Middle Triassic of Poland. It is classified as a member of the family Cyclotosauridae or Mastodonsauridae. It is closely related to the genus Cyclotosaurus. The type species, Tatrasuchus kulczyckii, was named in 1996. Damiani (2001) considered genus Kupferzellia Schoch (1997) from Middle Triassic of Germany to be a junior synonym of Tatrasuchus, and recombined its type species, K. wildi as the second species of Tatrasuchus. This classification was followed by some authors, e.g. Fortuny et al. (2011); other authors, e.g. Schoch (2008), maintain Tatrasuchus and Kupferzellia as distinct genera.

Phylogeny
Below is a cladogram from Fortuny et al. (2011):

References

Triassic temnospondyls of Europe
Prehistoric amphibian genera